Lynch is a Colombian television series from 2012–13 starring Natalia Oreiro and Jorge Perugorría. A central character is Jerónimo Lynch, owner of the Lynch Funeral Home, who is about to be arrested and accepts Isabel Reyes' offer to stage his death. This leads to their creation of a business staging the deaths of people who wish to assume new identities.

Cast 
 Natalia Oreiro - Isabel Reyes alias Mariana
 Jorge Perugorría - Jerónimo Lynch
 Alejandro Calva - Javier Buendía
 Tatán Ramírez - Leonardo Lynch Reyes
 Marcela Carvajal - Major Ángela Fernández de Triana
 Jorge Monterrosa - Aidan Scott
 Gabriela de la Garza - Irene
 Paula Castaño - Sara
 Christian Meier - Emilio Triana
 María Fernanda Yepes - Florencia Villalonga
 Salvador Zerboni - Gabriel Forlano 'El Capi'
 Inés Efrón - Emanuela
 Felipe Braun - director of the morgue
 Francisco Melo - Gabriel Hoffman
 Gonzalo Vivanco - Mauricio
 Raúl Méndez - George González
 Damián Alcázar - Eduardo Zúñiga

References

External links
 

2012 Colombian television series debuts
Colombian television sitcoms
2010s Colombian television series